Rezzoaglio (locally ) is a comune (municipality) in the Metropolitan City of Genoa in the Italian region Liguria.

Rezzoaglio  borders the following municipalities: Borzonasca, Favale di Malvaro, Ferriere, Fontanigorda, Lorsica, Montebruno, Orero, Ottone, Rovegno, San Colombano Certénoli, Santo Stefano d'Aveto.

Geography 

Rezzoaglio is part of the Aveto Natural Regional Park.

References

External links
Val d'Aveto

Cities and towns in Liguria